Arthophacopsis is a genus of fungi within the Arthoniales order. The genus has not been placed into a family. This is a monotypic genus, containing the single species Arthophacopsis parmeliarum.

References

Arthoniomycetes
Lichenicolous fungi
Monotypic Ascomycota genera
Taxa named by Josef Hafellner
Taxa described in 1998